Marilyn Elsie Imrie (20 November 1947 – 21 August 2020) was a Scottish theatre and radio drama director and producer.

Career
Marilyn Imrie worked in drama and broadcasting in Scotland and England for over thirty years as a producer and director, for the BBC, ITV and the independent companies Absolutely Productions, Bona Broadcasting, CBL, CIM, Kindle Entertainment and Sweet Talk. She was a drama producer in radio and television in BBC Scotland for twelve years before moving to London to devise and launch the BBC Radio 4 soap Citizens in 1987, then drama commissioning editor for BBC Radio 4 until 1999.

Imrie was a script executive for BBC Scotland Television drama, a drama development executive for three major independent companies and a producer and director in radio drama and in the theatre. She was awarded Sony, TRIC and Talkies awards for her radio production work, the Samuel Beckett Award for television drama for Paris (BBC Scotland for BBC 2) and an RTS Award for her work on the animation series Big & Small, starring Lenny Henry and Imelda Staunton.

Her BBC Radio work included twenty Rumpole plays, twenty-three of The Stanley Baxter Playhouse, eight Two Pipe Problems, four series of Baggage, and the Classic Serials: My Last Duchess, The Book of Love, Great Expectations, Lady Chatterley's Lover, The Card, Clarissa, The Lost World and The Heat of the Day. Theatre work includes: Overdue South by Jules Horne for the Traverse Theatre/BBC Scotland, Lie Down Comic by John Mortimer, The Bones Boys by Colin MacDonald for Òran Mór, Elsie and Mairi Go To War by Diane Atkinson, Blow Me Beautiful by Gabriel Quigley and Vicki Liddelle, Daphnis and Chloe adapted by Hattie Naylor for Òran Mór, Mortimer's Miscellany for the Henley Festival, and Prunella Scales and Edward Fox in their theatre entertainment English Eccentrics.

She was joint-chair of the board of Stellar Quines Theatre Company and a trustee of the new writing theatre company Paines Plough.

Imrie divided her working and home life between Edinburgh and London.

Personal life 
Daughter of John Campbell Imrie, of Redroofs, Markinch, Fife, Scotland, Marilyn Imrie married twice, the first (to actor Kenny Ireland) ending in divorce, the second in 1985 to the novelist and film-maker James Runcie, the son of Robert Runcie, the former Archbishop of Canterbury. Imrie had two daughters: Rosie Kellagher is a freelance theatre director who won an Arches Award for Directors in 2007, and directed Small Blue Thing, Mother Father Son and Macmillan's Marvellous Motion Machine for radio; and Charlotte Runcie, a writer and poet. The family lived in Edinburgh, Scotland.

Marilyn Imrie died at home in Edinburgh on 21 August 2020 from motor neurone disease.

Radio plays 

Notes:

Sources:
 Marilyn Imrie's radio play listing at Diversity website
 Marilyn Imrie's radio play listing at RadioListings website

Stage plays

References 

1947 births
2020 deaths
BBC Radio drama directors
BBC radio producers
Scottish radio producers
Scottish theatre directors
British theatre directors
Neurological disease deaths in Scotland
Deaths from motor neuron disease
Women theatre directors
Women radio producers